Bad Goisern am Hallstättersee is a market town in the Austrian state of Upper Austria in the district of Gmunden. It is part of the Salzkammergut resort area.  At the 2005 census Bad Goisern am Hallstättersee had a population of 7,578 inhabitants.

History 
Bad Goisern am Hallstättersee is a town with a long history.  It was first mentioned in the 13th century under the name "Gebisham".  In 1931 Goisern became a spa town and in 1952 it became a market town. Since 1955 Goisern is called "Bad" Goisern (Bad means bath in German and it is a title given by the government to cities with medicinal or thermal baths).  A famous development is the "Goiserer Schuh", a good wearable mountain-shoe.

Population

Personalities
 Hubert von Goisern (real-name: Hubert Achleitner) (*1952)
 Jörg Haider (1950-2008)
 Ursula Haubner (*1945)
 Franz Kain (1922–1997)
 Johanna Maislinger (*1985)
 Wilfried (singer) (1950-2017)

References

Cities and towns in Gmunden District
Spa towns in Austria